Palmoxylon (petrified palmwood) is an extinct genus of palm named from petrified wood found around the world.

Fossil record 
This genus is known in the fossil record from the Late Cretaceous to the Miocene (from about 84.9 to 11.6 million years ago). Fossils of species within this genus have been found in Germany, Italy (Sardinia), United States, Egypt, Libya and Argentina (Bororó and Salamanca Formations). Many species were described from the Deccan Traps in India.

Distribution 
A number of species from the Cretaceous and Cenozoic have been described from the Patagonia region of South America.  There have been a number of species reported from Egypt which are dated to the Late Eocene and Early Miocene.

Specimens from the Oligocene epoch (34 - 23 mya) can be collected from many scattered sites in east Texas and western Louisiana. Fossils found near fossil palmwood include corals, sponges, and mollusks, indicating that the palms grew along prehistoric beaches. For millions of years, the Gulf Coast shoreline has been moving farther south.

In Texas and Louisiana, petrified palmwood is most common in the Toledo Bend area, which is shared by both states. It was left by trees that grew when the Gulf of Mexico's shoreline was much farther north from its present-day position. In Louisiana, petrified palmwood is found in the parishes of Rapides, Natchitoches, Grant, and Sabine.

Description 

Petrified palmwood includes a group of fossil woods that contain prominent rod-like structures within the regular grain of the silicified wood. Depending upon the angle at which they are cut by fracture, these rod-like structures show up as spots, tapering rods, or continuous lines. The rod-like structures are sclerenchyma bundles that comprise part of the woody tissues that gave the wood its vertical strength.

Petrified palmwood is a favorite of rock collectors because it is replaced by silica and exhibits well-defined rod-like structures and variety of colors. As a result, it exhibits a wide range of colors and designs when cut that can be incorporated into jewelry and other ornamental items. Because it is composed of silica, it is hard enough to polish and withstand the wear and tear of normal use.

Archaeology 
In Grant Parish, Louisiana (and probably in other areas also), Native Americans used petrified palmwood to make projectile points and other tools such as knives, awls, and scrapers. Projectile points and other tools crafted from petrified palmwood have been discovered in central Grant Parish by H.R. Hicks and other Native American artifact collectors. It is the state stone of Texas and the official state fossil of Louisiana.

Species 

There are more than 200 species assigned to the genus Palmoxylon at this time.

Palmoxylon araneus Nour-El-Deen, El-Saadawi & Thomas, 2018 (Paleogene; Jebel Qatrani Formation, Egypt)
Palmoxylon arcotense
Palmoxylon bhisiensis Dutta et al., 2007 (Cretaceous; Deccan Traps, India)
Palmoxylon blandfordiSchenk, 1882 (Cretaceous; Deccan Traps, India)
Palmoxylon bororense
Palmoxylon chhindwarense Prakash, 1960 (Cretaceous; Deccan Traps, India)
Palmoxylon colei (Eocene; Green River Formation, Eden Valley, Wyoming)
Palmoxylon compactum
Palmoxylon concordiense
palmoxylon millie-- very rare to find but was very common in the united kingdom during winter
Palmoxylon contortum (Eocene; Green River Formation, Eden Valley, Wyoming)
Palmoxylon dakshinense Prakash, 1960 (Cretaceous; Deccan Traps, India)
Palmoxylon deccanensis Sahni, 1964 (Cretaceous; Deccan Traps, India)Palmoxylon dilacunosum Ambwani, 1984Palmoxylon edenense (Eocene; Green River Formation, Eden Valley, Wyoming)Palmoxylon elsaadawii Nour-El-Deen, El-Saadawi & Thomas, 2018 (Paleogene; Jebel Qatrani Formation, Egypt)Palmoxylon eocenum  Prakash, 1962 (Cretaceous; Deccan Traps, India)Palmoxylon geometricumPalmoxylon hislopi Rode, 1933 (Cretaceous, Deccan Traps; India)Palmoxylon indicumPalmoxylon kamalamRode, 1933 (Cretaceous, Deccan Traps; India)Palmoxylon lametaei  (Maastrichtian; Lameta Formation, Deccan Traps, India)Palmoxylon livistoniformePalmoxylon livistonoides Prakash & Ambwani, 1980 (Cretaceous, Deccan Traps; India)Palmoxylon macginitiei (Eocene; Green River Formation, Eden Valley, Wyoming)Palmoxylon mathuri Sahni, 1931 (Cretaceous, Gujarat, India)Palmoxylon parapaniensis Lakhanpal et al., 1979 (Cretaceous, Deccan Traps; India)Palmoxylon parthasarathyi Rao & Menon, 1964 (Cretaceous, Deccan Traps; India)
 Palmoxylon patagonicum  (Paleocene, Patagonia, Argentina)Palmoxylon pichaihuensisPalmoxylon pondicherriensePalmoxylon pyriformePalmoxylon qatraniense Nour-El-Deen, El-Saadawi & Thomas, 2018 (Paleogene; Jebel Qatrani Formation, Egypt)Palmoxylon queenslandicumPalmoxylon rewahensePalmoxylon riograndensePalmoxylon sagariPalmoxylon santarosensePalmoxylon superbum Trivedi & Verma, 1971 (Cretaceous, Deccan Traps; India)Palmoxylon valchetensePalmoxylon vaterumPalmoxylon wadai Sahni, 1931 (Cretaceous; Deccan Traps, India)Palmoxylon yuqueriense References 

 Further reading 
 McMackin, C. E., 1984, "Petrified wood from east to west; some we've liked best." Lapidary-Journal''. vol. 37, no. 11, p. 1582-1588.

External links 
 Petrified Palm Wood (State Fossil) (Tertiary)

Coryphoideae
Prehistoric angiosperm genera
Santonian genus first appearances
Late Cretaceous plants
Paleocene plants
Oligocene plants
Eocene plants
Miocene genus extinctions
Prehistoric life of Africa
Fossils of Egypt
Prehistoric life of Asia
Fossils of India
Prehistoric life of Europe
Fossils of Germany
Prehistoric plants of North America
Fossils of the United States
Prehistoric plants of South America
Riochican
Paleogene Argentina
Fossils of Argentina
Fossil taxa described in 1882
Arecaceae genera